Willa is a feminine given name. Notable people and characters with the name include:

 Willa or Guilla of Provence (died before 924), early medieval Frankish queen
 Willa of Tuscany (died 970), queen consort of Berengar II of Italy
 Willa Brown (1906–1992), African-American pioneering aviator, lobbyist, teacher and civil rights activist
 Willa Cather (1873–1947), American novelist and writer
 Willa McGuire Cook (1928–2017), American three-time world and 18-time national water skiing champion
 Willa Fitzgerald (born 1991), American actress
 Willa Ford, stage name of American singer, songwriter and actress Amanda Lee Williford (born 1981)
 Willa Holland (born 1991), American actress and model
 Willa Kim (Wullah Mei Ok Kim) (1917–2016), American costume designer for stage, dance and film
 Willa Muir (1890–1970), Scottish novelist, essayist and translator
 Willa O'Neill (born 1973), New Zealand actress
 Willa Beatrice Player (1909–2003), African-American educator, college president and civil rights activist
 Willa Shalit (born 1955), American sculptor, producer, photographer, author and activist
 Willa Schneberg (born 1952), American poet
 Willa, protagonist of the French-Canadian animated TV series Willa's Wild Life

See also
Hurricane Willa, October 2018 Pacific storm
Wila (disambiguation)

English-language feminine given names